Johann Heinrich Rosenplänter (12 July/23 July 1782 in Valmiera – 15 April/27 April 1846 in Pärnu) was a Baltic German linguist and Estophile. He edited one of the first scientific journals on the Estonian language, Beiträge zur genauern Kenntniß der ehstnischen Sprache (commonly referred to as Beiträge...).

References

1782 births
1846 deaths
People from Valmiera
Estophiles
Baltic-German people